Cochrane Water Aerodrome  is located  north of Cochrane, Ontario, Canada.

See also
Cochrane Aerodrome

References

Registered aerodromes in Cochrane District
Seaplane bases in Ontario